Keith Higgins is an Irish sportsperson. He has played both Gaelic football and hurling for Mayo GAA, the former until his retirement in January 2021. He also plays both sports for his club Ballyhaunis.

In 2006, he was the All Stars Young Footballer of the Year. He also captained both the Mayo under-21 football and hurling teams to All-Ireland Championships. Injury ruled him out of the 2007 championship. Higgins also represented Mayo at senior level in both codes, played for Connacht in hurling's Railway Cup, winning a medal in 2005, while in 2014 he became the first Connacht player to win football and hurling Railway Cups after Connacht won a first title since 1968.

Hurling is his first love. He plays it for Ballyhaunis. In 2005, Higgins won a Christy Ring Cup All Star while playing for the Mayo county team. In 2008, he was nominated for the Christy Ring Cup Player of the Year award. Higgins was voted as the Cadbury's Hero of the Future in 2006.

During Mayo's 2011 NFL campaign, Higgins received praise for his outstanding performances in right half back.

Higgins retired from inter-county football in January 2021. However, he expressed the wish to continue playing hurling for Mayo. He was revealed as Mayo hurling team captain in May 2021.

Honours
Football
Connacht Senior Football Championship (8): 2006, 2009, 2011–2015, 2020
National Football League (1): 2019
Connacht Under-21 Football Championship (1): 2006
All-Ireland Under-21 Football Championship (1): 2006
Railway Cup (1): 2014
Sigerson Cup (1): 2005
GAA GPA All Stars Awards (4): 2012–2014, 2017
All Star Young Footballer of the Year (1): 2006

Hurling
All-Ireland Junior Hurling Championship (1): 2003
Connacht Junior Hurling Championship (1): 2003
National Hurling League Division 2B (1): 2018
National Hurling League Division 3 (1): 2005
Railway Cup (1): 2004
Nicky Rackard Cup (2): 2016, 2021 (c)
Christy Ring Cup All Star (1): 2008
Nicky Rackard Cup Hurler of the Year (1): 2021

References

Living people
All Stars Young Footballers of the Year
Ballyhaunis Gaelic footballers
Ballyhaunis hurlers
Dual players
Gaelic football backs
Mayo inter-county Gaelic footballers
Mayo inter-county hurlers
1985 births